Guy Giorno (born 1965) is a Canadian lawyer and conservative political activist. He has served in the administration of Ontario Premier Mike Harris and Canadian Prime ministers Stephen Harper. He is described to come from the Mike Harris school of politics.

Career

Giorno graduating from the University of Toronto’s law school in 1989, he wrote speeches for Mike Harris in his 1990 Ontario Tory leadership run.  Giorno served an adviser and  Chief of Staff to then Premier of Ontario Mike Harris in 2000. Giorno along with Mike Harris were seen as the only two insiders within the Ontario Progressive Party sympathetic to the Reform Party. During the 2008 federal election, Paul Wells questioned if Giorno improved the fortune of the OPC after he became chief of staff to Mike Harris.

In 2002 he joined the Toronto office of the Fasken Martineau DuMoulin law firm. On July 1, 2008, Giorno succeeded Ian Brodie  as Chief of Staff in the Prime Minister's Office of Canadian Prime Minister Stephen Harper. During his time, Ministers who worked with him during the Harris government underneath his tenure as Chief of Staff such as Finance Minister Jim Flaherty, Industry Minister Tony Clement, and, particularly, Transport Minister John Baird rose in prominence. He was blamed for several strategic missteps by the Harper government, including a 2008 measure to strip political parties of their public funding that nearly led the government to fall, and an unpopular move to prorogue Parliament in January, 2010; he was also assumed to have pushed for the government's outlawing of Canadian foreign aid funding going to organizations overseas that were involved with abortion. During the 2017 Conservative race, Brad Trost demanded that he should pay back moving expense, Giorno made eight years ago.

He returned to Fasken Martineau effective January 1, 2011, and was replaced as Chief of Staff by Nigel S. Wright.  He is a fellow at the University of Toronto School of Public Policy & Governance.

In January 2011 he was appointed National Campaign Chair of the Conservative Party's re-election effort. He also served as national campaign chair in 2015. He was investigated and cleared by the party due to his role in the sexual assault cases against former MP Rick Dykstra. Macleans's noted that Giorno advocated for the removal of Dykstra.

In February 2017, Giorno was named Chief Integrity Officer and Lobbyist Registrar for the city of Brampton, Ontario, effective April 1 of that year. He later left   in 2019 due to his relationship with Patrick Brown, who elected as Mayor of Brampton in 2018. He later became an anti-bribery lawyer for the Toronto law firm Fasken.

References 

Living people
Chiefs of staff of the Canadian Prime Minister's Office
University of Toronto Faculty of Law alumni
Lawyers in Ontario
People from Toronto
1965 births